Kevin Anderson was the defending champion, but chose not to participate this year.

Jiří Veselý won the title, defeating Egor Gerasimov in the final, 7–6(7–2), 5–7, 6–3.

Seeds
The top four seeds receive a bye into the second round.

Draw

Finals

Top half

Bottom half

Qualifying

Seeds

Qualifiers

Qualifying draw

First qualifier

Second qualifier

Third qualifier

Fourth qualifier

References

External links
Singles Draw
Qualifying Draw

Singles